Lyssa is a genus of moths in the family Uraniidae. The genus was erected by Jacob Hübner in 1823.

Distribution
The genus includes relatively large moths that are found in southern Asia and the Pacific region.

Species
 Lyssa achillaria Hübner, 1816
 Lyssa aruus (Felder, 1874)
 Lyssa aurora (Salvin & Godman, 1877)
 Lyssa curvata Skinner, 1903 (Vanuatu)
 Lyssa fletcheri Regteren Altena, 1953
 Lyssa macleayi (Montrouzier, 1857) (Australia)
 Lyssa menoetius (Hopffer, 1856) (Borneo, Philippines, Sangir, Sulawesi)
 Lyssa mutata Butler, 1887 (Solomons)
 Lyssa patroclus (Linnaeus, 1758) (Moluccas)
 Lyssa patroclaria Hübner, 1816
 Lyssa toxopeusi Regteren Altena, 1953 
 Lyssa velutinus Röber, 1927 
 Lyssa zampa (Butler, 1869) (Himalayas to southern China, Thailand, Andamans, Philippines, Sulawesi)

References

External links

Uraniidae
Moth genera
Taxa named by Jacob Hübner